This is a list of years in East Timor.

21st century 

 
East Timor-related lists
East Timor